CLH may refer to:

Science
 Chlorophyllase, an enzyme
 Hydrogen chloride, a chemical compound

Companies
 CLH (company), a Spanish petroleum logistics company comprising Compañía Logística de Hidrocarburos and others
 CLH Pipeline System (CLH-PS), a UK system run by Compañía Logística de Hidrocarburos
 Lufthansa CityLine (ICAO code), a German airline
 Coolah Airport, IATA airport code "CLH"

See also
 CLHS (disambiguation)